The  was a class of submarine chasers of the Imperial Japanese Navy (IJN), serving during World War II. 3 vessels were built in 1936 – 1939 under the Maru 2 Programme. They have two subclasses, this article handles them collectively.

Background
 In 1934, the IJN planned an experimental model of a high-speed coast defense submarine chaser.
 The IJN ordered the hull design from Thornycroft, and the high-powered diesel design from MAN, to study a small-sized high-speed boat.

Design
 The Thornycroft drawings were not able to satisfy the IJN, because the design's center of gravity was too high, and had bad drainage. Kampon made a hull design based on the Hayabusa class torpedo boat instead.
 The IJN was satisfied with MAN diesel specifications, however their designs were very complicated and very expensive. The IJN bought two engines and labeled them . Further, the IJN ordered copies of these engines from Kawasaki Heavy Industries and Mitsubishi Heavy Industries.
 Also, 1 vessel was equipped with a Kampon turbine, because the MAN diesel engines were unsuitable for a mass production.

Service
 The IJN deployed them to a mine warfare school after having finished their examination, because they were too small.
 They became a training ship of the mine warfare school, and they acted in Tokyo Bay.

Ships in classes

No.251-class
Project number K5A. 2 vessels were completed. They were equipped with MAN design diesels. The No.252 was equipped the copied MAN diesels by Kawasaki and Mitsubishi.

No.251
 9 June 1937: Launched.
 30 September 1937: Completed.
 15 November 1940: Classified to the Auxiliary submarine chaser, and renamed .
 (after): Assigned to the mine warfare school (Kurihama).
 30 April 1943: Renamed .
 28 August 1944: Classified to the Support vessel (tugboat), and renamed .
 August 1945: The end of war at Uraga, later nothing more was heard.

No.252
 25 August 1937: Launched.
 25 July 1939: Completed.
 15 November 1940: Classified to the Auxiliary submarine chaser, and renamed .
 (after): Assigned to the mine warfare school (Kurihama).
 30 April 1943: Renamed .
 15 February 1944: Classified to the Support vessel (tugboat), and renamed .
 August 1945: The end of war at Uraga, later nothing more was heard.

No.253-class
Project number K5B. 1 vessels was completed. She was equipped with Kampon turbine. She was classed in the No.251-class in the IJN official documents.

No.253
 15 July 1937: Launched.
 31 October 1937: Completed.
 15 November 1940: Classified to the Auxiliary submarine chaser, and renamed .
 (after): Assigned to the mine warfare school (Kurihama).
 30 April 1943: Renamed .
 15 February 1944: Classified to the Support vessel (tugboat), and renamed .
 August 1945: The end of war at Uraga.
 August 1946: Sink by unknown effect.

Footnotes

Bibliography
Ships of the World special issue Vol.45, Escort Vessels of the Imperial Japanese Navy, (Japan), February 1996
The Maru Special, Japanese Naval Vessels No.49, Japanese submarine chasers and patrol boats,  (Japan), March 1981

World War II naval ships of Japan
Submarine chaser classes